"The Bullfighter Dies" is a song by English singer Morrissey. It is the seventh track on his World Peace Is None of Your Business album and was released as the fourth single off the album via digital download on 17 June 2014, through Harvest and Capitol Records. On 8 January 2015, Morrissey advised fans that a 45 of "The Bullfighter Dies" was scheduled for a global release by Harvest, but was scrapped by Steve Barnett at the last minute. The B-side was to be the original French mix of the song "One of Our Own".

Due to changes in global music consumption, the physical versions of the first four singles from this album were released together as one 10" vinyl.

Music video
The accompanying music video, directed by Natalie Johns, coincided with the release of the digital download. As with the preceding videos from the album, it is presented in spoken word. The spoken word video had previously leaked online on 18 May 2014.

Track listing
Digital download
 "The Bullfighter Dies" – 2:03

Critical reception
Spin magazine commented on the song, stating that "it's a brief but stirring two minutes, packed with sunny guitar leads and Moz's charming lilt. In short, it's a whole lot less morose than the downcast spoken word video might have led you to believe."

Personnel
 Morrissey – vocals

Additional musicians
 Boz Boorer – guitar 
 Jesse Tobias – guitar
 Solomon Walker – bass
 Matthew Walker – drums
 Gustavo Manzur – keyboards

Technical personnel
 Joe Chiccarelli – production

References

2014 songs
2014 singles
Morrissey songs
Harvest Records singles
Capitol Records singles
Songs written by Jesse Tobias
Songs written by Morrissey
Songs about animal rights
Songs about occupations
Songs about death